The Konkani language spoken in the Indian state of Goa has loanwords from multiple languages, including Arabic, Portuguese, English and Kannada. This is a list of loanwords in the Konkani language.

Portuguese words in KonkaniA. E. Medlycott, (1905) "India and the Apostle Thomas"; Gorgias Press LLC;

Catholic spiritual terms with Latin origins

Phrases

Family relationships

Family last names

Culinary terms

Kitchen items

Food produce (plant and animal)

Food Products

Daily use words

Education terms

Professional terms

Geographical descriptors

City and town names in Goa

Residential and business addresses

Architectural terms

Miscellaneous words

French words in Konkani

Kannada words in Konkani

Arabic / Persian words in Konkani 

Some words are also used wherein the original meaning has been changed or distorted:
Mustaiki (clothes) from mustaid = ready
bekar bahas (idle talk) gives bhikar bhaso (useless philosophising)
kapan khairo  - eater of one's own shroud  - miser

English words 
spanner- pan'no
false - phaals (could be of Portuguese origin too)
washer (ring between two joining surfaces or between a nut and a bolt) - vicer
shock absorber - chak'up'ser
cleaner (assistant to a bus driver) -- kilinder

See also
 List of loanwords in Gujarati
 List of loanwords in Marathi

References

Further reading
 
  
 
 Online Manglorean Konkani Dictionary Project

Konkani
Lists of loanwords